Stretford Bridge Junction Halt railway station was a station in Cheney Longville, Shropshire, England. The station was opened in May 1890 and closed on 20 April 1935.

References

Further reading

Disused railway stations in Shropshire
Railway stations in Great Britain opened in 1890
Railway stations in Great Britain closed in 1935